Sewing Woman is a 1982 American short documentary film directed by Arthur Dong about one woman's journey to America, from an arranged marriage in old China to life in San Francisco. It was nominated for an Academy Award for Best Documentary Short in 1984.

Synopsis
Sewing Woman is oral history of the filmmaker's mother, Zem Ping Dong, who immigrated from China and worked in San Francisco's garment industry for over thirty years.

References

External links
Sewing Woman at DeepFocus Productions

Sewing Woman at Third World Newsreel

1982 films
1982 documentary films
1982 short films
1980s short documentary films
Films about Chinese Americans
American short documentary films
American black-and-white films
Films directed by Arthur Dong
Documentary films about immigration to the United States
Documentary films about San Francisco
Films shot in San Francisco
1980s English-language films
1980s American films